The women's long jump event  at the 1987 IAAF World Indoor Championships was held at the Hoosier Dome in Indianapolis on 7 March. There was no qualification round, only a final round.

Results

References

Long jump
Long jump at the World Athletics Indoor Championships